Goebelsmuhle railway station is a railway station serving the village of Goebelsmuhle, in the commune of Bourscheid, in north-eastern Luxembourg.  It is operated by Chemins de Fer Luxembourgeois, the state-owned railway company.

The station is situated on Line 10, which connects Luxembourg City to the centre and north of the country.

External links

 Official CFL page on Goebelsmuhle station
 Rail.lu page on Goebelsmuhle station
 Photos on website of Spoorgroep Luxemburg

Bourscheid, Luxembourg
Railway stations in Luxembourg
Railway stations on CFL Line 10